Wawaka may refer to several locations in the United States:

 Wawaka, Indiana
 Wawaka Lake